"Portrait of Tracy" is a composition by American jazz bassist Jaco Pastorius.  It was named after his first wife, Tracy Sexton.

The song has been sampled by American R&B trio, SWV in their hit “Rain”.

The song was also sampled by British music producer Luke Vibert in his track “Mr. Mukatsuku”.

References 

1976 songs
Songs written by Jaco Pastorius